Tatyana Borisovna Averina (25 June 1950 – 22 August 2001) was a Soviet Russian speed skater. After getting married, her name also appeared as Tatyana Barabash.

Biography
Averina was trained by Boris Stenin at Burevestnik Voluntary Sports Society in Gorky. In 1970 she was selected for the USSR National Team. She finished in 12th place at the 1970 World All-around Championships and next year won a bronze medal in the 1,000 m at European Championships. In 1972, she won the 500 m event at the Winter Universiade.

Between 1974 and 1975 Averina broke world records eleven times: four times in the 1000 m, twice in the 1,500 m, twice in the 500 m and three times in the mini combination. In 1976 she earned the title Honoured Master of Sports of the USSR. She participated in the 1976 Winter Olympics in Innsbruck and won medals (two gold and two bronze) on all four distances. The Swiss newspaper Sport had written shortly before the Olympic Games, "Narrow specialisation has solidly taken root in the skating sport and these days it will be very hard to find an athlete who will compete in all distances and achieve successes in all, similar to Clas Thunberg and Lidia Skoblikova."

Averina took part in the 1980 Winter Olympics in Lake Placid, but did not win any medal. After having won 3 silver medals in earlier years (1974, 1975 and 1976), Averina became World Allround Champion in 1978. In 1979, she became Soviet Allround Champion. Earlier, she had become Soviet Sprint Champion three times (1973, 1974 and 1975).

Medals

An overview of medals won by Averina at important championships she participated in, listing the years in which she won each:

World records
Over the course of her career, Averina skated eleven world records:

Personal records
To put these personal records in perspective, the WR column lists the official world records on the dates that Averina skated her personal records.

Note that Averina's personal record on the 3,000 m was not a recognised as a world record by the International Skating Union (ISU). Also note that the 5,000 m was suspended as a world record event at the 1955 ISU Congress and was reinstated at the 1982 ISU Congress.

Averina has an Adelskalender score of 184.589.

References

External links

Tatyana Averina at SkateResults.com
Personal records from Jakub Majerski's Speedskating Database
Evert Stenlund's Adelskalender pages
Short biography of Tatyana Averina (in Russian)

1950 births
2001 deaths
Soviet female speed skaters
Burevestnik (sports society) athletes
Honoured Masters of Sport of the USSR
Recipients of the Order of the Red Banner of Labour
Olympic speed skaters of the Soviet Union
Speed skaters at the 1976 Winter Olympics
Speed skaters at the 1980 Winter Olympics
Olympic gold medalists for the Soviet Union
Olympic bronze medalists for the Soviet Union
Olympic medalists in speed skating
World record setters in speed skating
Russian female speed skaters
Lesgaft National State University of Physical Education, Sport and Health alumni
Medalists at the 1976 Winter Olympics
Universiade medalists in speed skating
World Allround Speed Skating Championships medalists
Universiade gold medalists for the Soviet Union
Competitors at the 1972 Winter Universiade
Burials in Troyekurovskoye Cemetery
Sportspeople from Nizhny Novgorod